The Yamaha DragStar 950 (also known as the V Star 950 and the XVS950/XVS950A Midnight Star) is a cruiser motorcycle produced by Yamaha Motor Company. The transmission is a five-speed manual with a multi-plate wet clutch and final belt drive. The bike was designed as an entry-level cruiser motorcycle and is available in standard and touring versions.

The DragStar 950 has received generally positive reviews and was awarded V Twin Magazine's "Metric of the Year" award for 2009.

References

Dragstar 950
Cruiser motorcycles
Motorcycles introduced in 2009